The Lorraine Group is a geologic group in the northeastern United States and southeastern Canada.

It preserves fossils dating back to the Ordovician Period.

The group is host to pyritized trilobites and other fossils in New York including the Beecher's Trilobite Bed.

See also

 List of fossiliferous stratigraphic units in Indiana
 List of fossiliferous stratigraphic units in Kentucky
 List of fossiliferous stratigraphic units in New York
 List of fossiliferous stratigraphic units in Ohio
 List of fossiliferous stratigraphic units in Ontario
 List of fossiliferous stratigraphic units in Quebec
 List of fossiliferous stratigraphic units in Tennessee

References

 

Ordovician System of North America
Geologic groups of Indiana
Geologic groups of Kentucky
Geologic groups of New York (state)
Geologic groups of Ohio
Geologic groups of Tennessee
Ordovician Indiana
Ordovician Kentucky
Ordovician geology of New York (state)
Ordovician Ohio
Ordovician Ontario
Ordovician Quebec
Ordovician geology of Tennessee